Shunak (Şūnaq meteorit kraterı) is a meteorite impact crater in the southeastern part of Qaraghandy Province in Kazakhstan.

The crater is exposed at the surface.

References 

Impact craters of Kazakhstan
Eocene impact craters